USS Yucca was a steamer acquired by the Union Navy during the American Civil War. She was used by the Union Navy as a gunboat in support of the Union Navy security of Confederate waterways.

Commissioned in Boston shortly before civil war’s end

Yucca—a wooden-hulled screw steamer built in 1864 by Donald McKay at East Boston, Massachusetts—was purchased by the Navy on 25 February 1865 and was commissioned at Boston on 3 April 1865, Acting Master Henry C. Wade in command.

Assigned to patrol the Gulf Station
 
Commissioned just six days before General Robert E. Lee surrendered the Army of Northern Virginia effectively ending the American Civil War, Yucca saw no combat in that or any other conflict. Her period of active service covered only three years, most of which she spent on the Gulf Station in the Gulf of Mexico. One sailor, Captain of the Hold John Robinson, was awarded the Medal of Honor for swimming ashore during a storm to aid Yucca on 19 January 1867.

Placed in ordinary
By 1868, she had moved to Portsmouth, New Hampshire, where she was placed in ordinary.

Post-war decommissioning and sale
On 26 August 1868, Yucca was sold at Portsmouth to Mr. R. M. Funkhauser.

See also

Union Navy
Union Blockade

References

Ships of the Union Navy
American Civil War patrol vessels of the United States
Steamships of the United States Navy
Gunboats of the United States Navy
Ships built in Boston
1864 ships